Santer is a surname. Notable people with the surname include:

Anna Santer (born 1975), Italian cross-country skier
Benjamin D. Santer, climate researcher at Lawrence Livermore National Laboratory
Bradley Santer (born 1982), Australian figure skater
Diederick Santer (born 1969), British television producer
Jacques Santer (born 1937), Luxembourgian politician
Mark Santer (born 1936), Anglican bishop
Patrick Santer (born 1970), Luxembourgian lawyer and politician for the Christian Social People's Party
Saskia Santer (born 1977), Italian biathlete

See also
Nathalie Santer-Bjørndalen (born 1972), Italian biathlete